Hikayat Malim Dewa  (Jawi: حكاية ماليم ديوا) is a historical Malay literary work. The identity of the author is unknown. It is among few surviving Malay historical literary works.

References
 Ana, P. (1908). Hikayat Malim Dewa [Microfilm: NL 11759]. London: Reprographic Section, Reference Service Division, British Library. (RSING 398.209595 ANA)

External links
 PDF - Aksara: The Passage of Malay Scripts.
 Carian Buku di google Published by Methodist Pub. House, 1908.
 Hikayat Malim Dewa by Pawang Ana Published in 1964, Oxford University Press (Kuala Lumpur, New York).

History of Malaysia
Malay-language literature
Works of unknown authorship